Huai Pa Daeng is a watercourse of Thailand. It is a tributary of the Pa Sak River, part of the Chao Phraya River basin. In English it can be translated as the "Red Forest Stream", the "Stream of the Deciduous Dipterocarp Forest" or the "Stream of the Xylia xylocarpa Forest.

Pa Daeng